Norman Spencer (23 February 1958 – 31 August 2020) was a Canadian voice and television actor best known for his work on Saturday-morning cartoons in the 1990s. He performed several roles for Marvel Comics characters, most famously Cyclops in X-Men and the Marvel vs. Capcom video games.

Before moving into full-time commercial voice work, Spencer was a creative writer in radio, most notably at CFNY-FM in Toronto, Ontario.

He died on 31 August 2020, at the age of 62. No cause of death was published.

Filmography

Film

Film (Animated)

Television

Television (Animated)

Video games

References

External links
 

1958 births
2020 deaths
Canadian male television actors
Canadian male video game actors
Canadian male voice actors
Male actors from Vancouver
Place of birth missing
Place of death missing
20th-century Canadian male actors
21st-century Canadian male actors